Erica Shaffer is an American actress who has worked in independent films and television.

Some of the films include A Family Affair, The Truth is Always Complicated, The Fall, Catalina Trust, The Socratic Method, Three on a Match and West Coast.

A few of Shaffer's television credits include guest star and recurring roles on Days of Our Lives, Valentine, Eleventh Hour, The Secret Life of the American Teenager, CSI Miami, Las Vegas, The King of Queens, Windfall, The Young and the Restless, Charmed, Mind of Mencia, Clubhouse, Fight for Fame, Silk Stalkings, Veronica's Closet, Nightman and [Pensacola'. She has been host of shows such as Vacation Challenge on the Travel Channel and Cafe Sound on Access Entertainment Network.

Shaffer has been in more than 200 commercials and has also been the host of the web series Personal Injury Network.

Shaffer is a voice over artist for animation and has an array of "characters" to her credit including the lead heroines and villains in Pioneer LDC's Nazca, I My Me! Strawberry Eggs, Paranoia Agent and Amazing Nurse Nanako. She has also done voiceovers for radio commercials as well as documentaries for The Learning Channel and The History Channel.

Roles from Shaffer's theater career at the Laguna Playhouse include, "Ruth" from Harvey, starring Charles Durning.  Other favorite roles in theater include "Portia" from The Merchant of Venice, "Myrhhine", from Lysistrata, "Joanne" from Come Back to the 5 & Dime, Jimmy Dean, Jimmy Dean and "Rose of Sharon" from The Grapes of Wrath. In San Diego Shaffer played "Hyacinth" in Scapan directed by William Ball.

She is a member of the Screen Actors Guild (SAG), the American Federation of Television and Radio Artists (AFTRA) and Actors' Equity Association. (AEA)

Shaffer is a private speech and acting coach with her own practice on the Westside of Los Angeles.

Filmography

Anime
 Nazca (1998): Yuka Kiritake/Aquira
 Amazing Nurse Nanako (1999): Satsuki
 I My Me! Strawberry Eggs (2001): Vice Principal
 Texhnolyze (2003): Promoter's Lover
 Ikki tôsen (2003): Kanu Uncho
 R.O.D the TV (2003): Cabin Attendant/Tachibana Reporter
 Mermaid Forest (2003): Hazuki's Mother
 Licensed by Royalty (2003): Cynthia
 Môsô dairinin (2004): Harumi Chono/Maria
 Ergo Proxy (2006): Quinn, Entourage

Television
 Night Man (1998)
 Hang Time (1999)
 18 Wheels of Justice (1 episode, 2000)
 The King of Queens (1 episode, 2005)
 Charmed (1 episode, 2005)
 Drake & Josh (1 episode, 2005)
 The Young and the Restless (2 episodes, 2004–2005)
 Las Vegas (1 episode, 2006)
 Windfall (1 episode, 2006)
 CSI: Miami (1 episode, 2007)
 Private Practice (1 episode, 2010)
 Scandal (38 episodes, 2012–2018)
 Castle'' (1 episode, 2013)

TV commercials
 Mercury Auto Insurance
 Shoe Pavilion
 3-day Blinds
 StressEez (2006)
 Time Life 70s Music Explosion (2005)
 WD-40 (2006)
 Mighty Key (2007)
 Miracle-Gro (2006–07)
 Chase (2007)
 Pizza Hut (2007)
 Shur-Line (2008)
 KY Warming Gel (2006–08)
 Sargento (2008)
 Walmart (2009)
 Mattress Warehouse (2009)
 Shake Weight
 3M Command Hooks (2010)
 Burger King (2010)
 East Side Mario's (2011)
 Sunsweet Prunes (2011)
 Fidelity Investments (2012)
 LG Electronics (2012)
 Scotties Tissues (2013)
 Chrysler (2014)
 KFC (2015)
 7-up (2017)
 Direct Energy (2017)
 San Antonio Tourism (2017)
 Spectrum Business Internet (2018)
 Ilumya (2019)
 Wayfair (2019)
 Gain laundry detergent (2020)
 Abreva Commercial  (2020)
 Ozempic (2022)
 Skechers (2022)

Infomercials
 70s Music Explosion (2005)
 Bowflex TreadClimber (2006)
 BetterTrades (2007)
 Kiyoseki Pro (2007)
 Cobra Stunlight (2007)
 Nutrisystem for Men (2007)
 Luminess Air (2007)
 Ultreo (2007)
 KY  (2006)
 Billboards 70s (2009)
 Ninja (2010)
 Food Saver System (2011)

References

External links
 
 Official Erica Shaffer Website
 Instagram
 Facebook
 Twitter

20th-century American actresses
21st-century American actresses
Actresses from Los Angeles
American television actresses
American voice actresses
Living people
Year of birth missing (living people)